The Lișava is a left tributary of the river Caraș (Karaš) in Romania. It discharges into the Caraș in Vărădia.

References

Rivers of Romania
Rivers of Caraș-Severin County